The Hartford Dark Blues joined the new National League for its first season in 1876, and team owner Morgan Bulkeley was the first National League president. They finished the season in second place.

Regular season

Season standings

Record vs. opponents

Roster

Player stats

Batting

Starters by position
Note: Pos = Position; G = Games played; AB = At bats; H = Hits; Avg. = Batting average; HR = Home runs; RBI = Runs batted in

Other batters
Note: G = Games played; AB = At Bats; H = Hits; Avg. = Batting average; HR = Home runs; RBI = Runs batted in

Pitching

Starting pitchers
Note: G = Games pitched; IP = Innings pitched; W = Wins; L = Losses; ERA = Earned run average; SO = Strikeouts

References
1876 Hartford Dark Blues season at Baseball Reference

Hartford Dark Blues seasons
Hartford Dark Blues season
Hartford